Earle Francis Brucker Jr. (August 25, 1925 – March 28, 2009) was a professional baseball player. He played two games as a catcher in Major League Baseball for the Philadelphia Athletics in 1948. After playing several seasons in minor league baseball, including a brief stint in the Pacific Coast League in 1953, he retired from baseball in 1955. He spent most of his life as the owner and operator of the Cajon Speedway in El Cajon, California.

Brucker was the son of Earle Brucker Sr., who played five seasons in the major leagues for the Athletics himself.  When Earle Sr. joined the Athletics coaching staff in 1941, Earle Jr. was made the bullpen catcher at the age of 15.

Earle Sr. had gotten a 50-year lease a property near Gillespie Airport, which he attempted to lease to the Detroit Tigers as a spring training facility. When they declined, he turned the property into a racetrack, fairgrounds and high school football stadium. He turned the property over to Earle Jr. in 1958. One of his sons, Steve Brucker, took over the track but was murdered in 2003. With the death of Brucker and the speedway lease ending in 2005, the track shut down after the 2004 racing season.

Brucker died at his home in El Cajon on March 28, 2009.

See also
List of second-generation Major League Baseball players

References

External links

1925 births
2009 deaths
Baseball players from San Diego
Beaumont Exporters players
Philadelphia Athletics players
Lincoln A's players
Major League Baseball catchers
Martinsville A's players
Raleigh Capitals players
San Diego Padres (minor league) players
Savannah Indians players
Tampa Smokers players
Tulsa Oilers (baseball) players
Sportspeople from El Cajon, California
San Diego High School alumni